Rory Mcfarlane is a British session musician who has also written scores for anime and games. He is probably best known for his score to the influential anime series Cyber City Oedo 808 (1990–1991). He also composed a score for a game called Buichi Terasawa's "Takeru: Letter of the Law" in 1996.

Other than scoring, he has had a much more prolific career as a session musician for Richard Thompson's band, playing electric and standing bass.

References

External links
A picture of him
Rory McFarlane at Mobygames
 
Rory McFarlane at Last.fm

Year of birth missing (living people)
Anime composers
British bass guitarists
British film score composers
British male film score composers
British session musicians
British television composers
Living people
Male bass guitarists
Male television composers